In Peru, Pacucha may refer to:
 Lake Pacucha
 Pacucha District